Keshi (Japanese: 消し or ケシ) aka keshigomu (消しゴム, literally "erase rubber") is the Japanese word for eraser. In modern "keshi" refers to a collectible miniature figure, often of a manga or anime character, made of coloured hard rubber. However, the word's reference has broadened beyond its etymological meaning, as keshi are made of several types of rubber, ranging in appearance from opaque matte to transparent. Also, some lines, such as the "Cosmos Souls Keshi Gum" (コスモスザウルス消しゴム, kosumosu saurusu keshi gomu), use plastic parts. Keshi figures are not necessarily based on Japanese comic book or TV series franchises, since there are keshi dedicated to video games (Super Mario, Zelda, etc.) and some western lines are based on local mythologies and popular culture. A similar product is often mistakenly thought be keshi, the pencil cap toy (ペンシル キャップ, penshiru kyappu) which appeared around the same period.

History
Keshi is a toy genre with Japanese roots but is not limited to Japanese manufacture nor Japanese culture as the keshi were sold and became popular all around the world in the last twenty years, and some keshi lines were made in Europe or in China and exported.

This toy genre appeared in Japan during the 1970s and became increasingly popular throughout the years. Adult Collectors and Kids alike would paint and expose Ultra Q, Ultraman, Ultraseven, The Return of Ultraman, Ultraman Ace, Ultraman Taro, Ultraman Leo, Ultraman 80, Ultraman Tiga, Booska, Mirrorman, Captain Ultra, Kamen Rider, Kamen Rider V3, Kamen Rider X, Kamen Rider Amazon, Kamen Rider Stronger, Kamen Rider (Skyrider), Kamen Rider Super-1, Kamen Rider Black, Kamen Rider Black RX, Android Kikaider, Kikaider 01, Akumaizer 3, Inazuman, Robot Detective, Kaiketsu Zubat, Himitsu Sentai Gorenger, Barom-1, Space Ironmen Kyodain, Space Sheriff Gavan, Space Sheriff Sharivan, Space Sheriff Shaider, Nebula Mask Machine Man, Spider-Man, Daitetsujin 17, Giant Robo, Godzilla, Gamera, various Kaiju, Marvel, DC Comics, Transformers, Gundam, Zoids, Votoms, Astro Boy, Gegege no Kitaro, Hello Kitty, Fist of the North Star, Cyborg 009, Cutie Honey, Devilman, Star Wars, Sailor Moon, Dragon Ball, Pokémon, Digimon, Doraemon, High School! Kimengumi, Dragon Quest: The Adventure of Dai, Dr. Slump or even Kinnikuman keshis (known as Kinkeshi).

The first keshi exported outside Japan appeared in the late 1970s in Bonux packages, a Procter & Gamble washing powder released in France (and recently introduced in former USSR states such as Ukraine). The Bonux brand was launched with the "cadeau Bonux" (the Bonux present) concept, a small value mini toy hidden inside the powder. Some keshi were part of these packages, including a 10-figure series of the, then, famous Monchhichi (モンチッチ). A monkey character created in 1974 by Koichi Sekiguchi and part of the first large scale, successful, exported Japanese anime franchises. The Bonux Monchhichi figures were 4.4/4.8 cm tall, chibikeshi styled, and available in seven different gums.

However the keshi phenomenon sped-up worldwide in the late 1980s, early 1990s, with a wave of gum toy lines named M.U.S.C.L.E. (Kinkeshi americanized), Fistful Of Monsters or Monster In My Pocket in the United States.

The same lines were also exported in Europe, sometimes under different names, e.g. M.U.S.C.L.E. became Exogini in Italy and Cosmix in France. These franchises are actually composite bootleg lines including Kinkeshi/M.U.S.C.L.E., N.I.N.J.A.S. and Fistful Of Monsters, in the very same collection. Though, licensed lines appeared in Europe, including BeastFormer localized as "Les Dragonautes" in France and Monster In My Pocket.

Around the same period, Keshi lines were also marketed in South East Asia, including South Korea.

Modern keshi
In Japan, Keshi were still popular in the 2000s (decade), and "keshi days" are often organized in Mandarake stores where collectors can sell and buy used keshis.

Bandai America has launched the M.U.S.C.L.E.'s series' sequel in the United States market only in 2003 as a 20th anniversary celebration of the original Kinkeshi (M.U.S.C.L.E.'s original name) line. The new American keshi line is named Micro Muscle Wrestlers.

Western keshi
The popular Monster In My Pocket line was created in the United States in the early 1990s as an answer to the massive success of the Japan imported M.U.S.C.L.E. (Kinkeshi). This line was exported in Europe and in Japan, where it is known as 米のモンスター消しゴム (American Monster Keshi Gum).

As a 20th anniversary celebration of its 1983–87 Kinkeshi line, the American branch of Bandai has launched the Micro Muscle Wrestler line in the United States. Even though it is the sequel of the M.U.S.C.L.E. line (overseas version of the Kinkeshi Kinnikuman series), this Micro Muscle Wrestler are exclusively marketed in the USA. In Australia mini figures such as Shopkins and Trash Pack can be considered a type of keshi.

Keshi packages
The keshi are sold in transparent plastic capsules (1–5 figures), opaque bags (1/2), plastic pots (10-pack), partially transparent carton boxsets (28), or the regular transparent plastic pack (3–6). Some lines have special packages like the Exogini pyramid ships (20/1940) in Italy, or the 205-figure collector set released in Japan (Kinkeshi). Some keshi are offered in washing powder packages, crisps or cereals bags. Catalogue color leaflets are included in Japanese capsule keshi, showing the series figures. Such series are named "PART", or its Japanese equivalent "パート" (pāto) and "ぱと" (pato), by Bandai and other brands.

Keshi types
Although vending machines keshi are often considered as standard size, three different material are used, hard gum, plastic or gum w/plastic parts. Even though dark salmon matte color mini figures are the quickest types identified as keshi in western countries, due to the famous M.U.S.C.L.E. line, there are actually a wide variety of gum from matte to bright, from translucent to transparent, from white to black, including the deluxe painted types.

Dekakeshi
Dekakeshi (デカ消し) are big size keshi released by the Marukoshi company prior to Bandai's popular lines.

Keshi
The standard keshi are 5/5.5 cm mini figures sold in transparent plastic capsules available in Bandai vending machines known as "gachagacha" (ガチャガチャ).

Chibikeshi
Chibikeshi (チビ消し) are mini size keshi released by Bandai.

SDkeshi
SDkeshi (SD消し) are Super Deformed mini size keshi released by Bandai.

Full color keshi
Full color keshi are deluxe, hand painted, keshi. Originally made in Japan, these art keshi were later manufactured in China to reduce production cost.

Glowing keshi
Glowing in the dark western keshi lines or series made of phosphorescent gum and similar to Playskool's GLO Friends contemporary mini figures line.

Famous keshi lines
Keshi list sorted by line starting year. (a keshi line running from 1980 to 1995 would be in the "1980–1990" section)

1980–1990
Kinkeshi (Bandai) 
M.U.S.C.L.E. (Mattel) 
Exogini (GIG) 
Cosmix (Action GT) 
Alien Wrestler (?)  
BeastFormer/LaserBeast (Takara) 
Battle Beasts/Laser Beasts (Hasbro) 
Les Dragonautes (?) 
Fistful Of Monsters (?) 
Exogini (GIG) 
Cosmix (Action GT) 
N.I.N.J.A.S. (Mattel?) 
Exogini (GIG) 
Cosmix (Action GT)

1990–2000
Monster In My Pocket (Matchbox) 
Monster In My Pocket (?) 
Monster In My Pocket (?)

2000–present
Micro Muscle Wrestlers (Bandai of America) 
Fistful of Power! (Moose Toys), (Spin Master)  
Gormiti (GIG), (Playmates Toys)  
Shopkins (Moose Toys)  
Trash Pack (Moose Toys)  
The Grossery Gang (Moose Toys)  

 
1970s toys
1980s toys
1990s toys
2000s toys
2010s toys
Toy collecting
Toy figurines